Richard Edmund Lyng (June 29, 1918 – February 1, 2003) was a U.S. administrator. A Republican, he served as the Secretary of Agriculture between 1986 and 1989. (See also: Lyng v. Northwest Indian Cemetery Protective Ass'n)

Early life and career
Lyng was born on June 29, 1918, in San Francisco, California.  He was the son of Edmund John Lyng, the founder of a California agricultural products company, and his wife, Sara Cecilia (McGrath).  He graduated from the University of Notre Dame.  He served in the U.S. Army during World War II.

In the mid-1950s, Lyng went into business and eventually became president of the Ed. J. Lyng Co., a seed and bean processing company. In 1973, Lyng became the President of the American Meat Institute, serving until 1979. In 1980, Lyng was appointed to Deputy Secretary of Agriculture, and then Secretary of Agriculture under President Reagan's cabinet, serving from 1986 to 1989.  He was chosen as one of the charter members of the Meat Industry Hall of Fame in 2009.

Personal life
Lyng married Bethyl Ball on June 25, 1944.  They had two daughters, Jeannette Lyng Robinson and Marylin Lyng O'Connell. Bethyl Lyng died in 2000.

Lyng died of complications from Parkinson's disease in Modesto, California, on February 1, 2003.

References

External links

1918 births
2003 deaths
Deaths from Parkinson's disease
Neurological disease deaths in California
United States Secretaries of Agriculture
Reagan administration cabinet members
20th-century American politicians
People from San Francisco
People from Modesto, California
Military personnel from California
20th-century American businesspeople
United States Deputy Secretaries of Agriculture